Lydia (minor planet designation: 110 Lydia) is a large belt asteroid with an M-type spectrum, and thus may be metallic in composition, consisting primarily of nickel-iron. It was discovered by French astronomer Alphonse Borrelly on 19 April 1870 and was named for Lydia, the Asia Minor country populated by Phrygians. The Lydia family of asteroids is named after it.

Observations made during 1958–1959 at the McDonald Observatory and in 1969 at the Kitt Peak National Observatory found an uneven light curve with a period of 10.9267 hours. In the late 1990s, a network of astronomers worldwide used light curves to derive spin states and shape models of 10 new asteroids, including (110) Lydia. They obtained a period of 10.92580 hours, with the brightness varying by no more than 0.2 in magnitude.

In the Tholen classification system, it is categorized as an M-type asteroid, while the Bus asteroid taxonomy system lists it as an Xk asteroid. Absorption features in the near infrared are attributed to low-iron, low-calcium orthopyroxene minerals. Water content on the surface is estimated at 0.14–0.27 by mass fraction (wt%). It is a likely interloper in the Padua family of minor planets that share similar dynamic properties.

Lydia occulted a dim star on 18 September 1999.

References

External links 
 Lightcurve plot of 110 Lydia, Palmer Divide Observatory, B. D. Warner (2012)
 Asteroid Lightcurve Database (LCDB), query form (info )
 Dictionary of Minor Planet Names, Google books
 Asteroids and comets rotation curves, CdR Observatoire de Genève, Raoul Behrend
 Discovery Circumstances: Numbered Minor Planets (1)–(5000) Minor Planet Center
 
 

000110
Discoveries by Alphonse Borrelly
Named minor planets
000110
000110
000110
18700419